was a Qing dynasty princess of the Aisin-Gioro clan. She was raised in Japan and served as a spy for the Japanese Kwantung Army and Manchukuo during the Second Sino-Japanese War. She is sometimes known in fiction under the pseudonym "Eastern Mata Hari". After the war, she was captured, tried, and executed as a traitor by the Nationalist government of the Republic of China. She was also a notable descendant of Hooge, eldest son of Hong Taiji.

Names
She was born in the Aisin Gioro clan, the imperial clan of the Manchu-led Qing dynasty. Her birth name was Aisin Gioro Xianyu and her courtesy name was Dongzhen (literally "eastern jewel"). Her Sinicised name was Jin Bihui. She is best known by her Japanese name, Kawashima Yoshiko (川島 芳子), which is read as Chuāndǎo Fāngzǐ in Chinese. In 1925, Yoshiko took the male name Ryōsuke.

Family background and early life

She was born Aisin Gioro Xianyu in Beijing in 1907 as the 14th daughter of Shanqi (1866–1922), a Manchu prince of the Aisin Gioro clan, the imperial clan of China's Qing dynasty. Her mother was Lady Janggiya, Shanqi's fourth concubine. Shanqi was a descendant of Hooge, the eldest son of Hong Taiji (the second ruler of the Qing dynasty). Shanqi was also the tenth heir to the Prince Su peerage, one of the 12 "iron-cap" princely peerages of the Qing dynasty.

After the Xinhai Revolution overthrew the Qing dynasty in 1912, Xianyu was given up for adoption in 1915 at the age of eight to her father's friend, Naniwa Kawashima, a Japanese espionage agent and mercenary adventurer. Her stepfather changed her name to "Yoshiko Kawashima" and took her back to Tokyo, Japan to be raised and educated in the Kawashima family house. As a teenage girl, Kawashima was sent to school in Tokyo for an education that included judo and fencing.

Around the time her adoptive family moved to Matsumoto. Kawashima's biological father, Shanqi, died in 1922. As Kawashima's mother had no official identity as Shanqi's concubine, she followed Manchu tradition and committed suicide to join Shanqi in death. At the age of seventeen, her adoptive father raped her and later continued to abuse her.

On 22 November 1925, Yoshiko said that she had "...decided to cease being a woman forever." Earlier that day she had dressed in a kimono with a traditional female hair style and took a photo among blooming cosmos to commemorate "my farewell to life as a woman." That evening, Yoshiko went to a barbershop and had all her hair cut off, adopting a crew cut and from then on dressing in men's clothes.

She explained in another article two days after the first that "I was born with what the doctors call a tendency toward the third sex, and so I cannot pursue an ordinary woman's goals in life... Since I was young I've been dying to do the things that boys do. My impossible dream is to work hard like a man for China, for Asia."

Earlier in her life it had been remarked upon that she had "boyish habits" despite her feminine beauty and that she would only use the male style of Japanese grammar, even after that contributed to her not being re-admitted to her school after her biological father's death.

Espionage career
In November 1927 at age 20, her brother and adoptive father arranged for her marriage to Ganjuurjab in Port Arthur (also known as Ryojun), who was the son of Inner Mongolian Army general Babojab, who once led the Mongolian-Manchurian Independence Movement there in 1911. The marriage ended in divorce after only three years and she left Mongolia, and she first traveled to teeming coastal towns of China and lived a bohemian lifestyle for some years in Tokyo with a series of rich lovers, both men and women. Kawashima moved to the foreign concession in Shanghai. While in Shanghai, she met Japanese military attaché and intelligence officer Ryukichi Tanaka, who utilised her contacts with the Manchu and Mongol nobility to expand his network. She was living with Tanaka in Shanghai at the time of the Shanghai Incident of 1932.

After Tanaka was recalled to Japan, Kawashima continued to serve as a spy for the general Kenji Doihara. She undertook undercover missions in Manchuria, often in disguise, and was considered "strikingly attractive, with a dominating personality, almost a film-drama figure, half tom-boy and half heroine, and with a passion for dressing up as a male. She possibly did this in order to impress the men, or she may have done it in order to more easily fit into the tightly-knit guerrilla groups without attracting too much attention".

Kawashima was well-acquainted with Puyi, the last emperor of the Qing dynasty, who regarded her as a member of the imperial family and welcomed her into his household during his stay in Tianjin. It was through this close liaison that Kawashima was able to persuade Puyi to become a figurehead ruler for Manchukuo, a puppet state created by the Japanese in Manchuria. However, Kawashima privately criticised Puyi for being too amenable to Japanese influence.

After Puyi became Emperor of Manchukuo, Kawashima continued to play various roles and, for a time, was the mistress of Hayao Tada, the chief military advisor to Puyi. She formed an independent counterinsurgency cavalry force in 1932 made up of 3,000-5,000 former bandits to hunt down anti-Japanese guerrilla bands during the Pacification of Manchukuo, and was hailed in the Japanese newspapers as the Joan of Arc of Manchukuo. In 1933, she offered the unit to the Japanese Kwantung Army for Operation Nekka, but it was refused. The unit continued to exist under her command until sometime in the late 1930s.

Kawashima became a well-known and popular figure in Manchukuo, making appearances on radio broadcasts and even issuing a record of her songs. Numerous fictional and semi-fictional stories of her exploits were published in newspapers and also as pulp fiction. However, her very popularity created issues with the Kwantung Army because her utility as an intelligence asset was long gone, and her value as a propaganda symbol was compromised by her increasingly critical tone against the Japanese military's exploitative policies in Manchukuo as a base of operations against China in the Second Sino-Japanese War, and she gradually faded from public sight.

Capture, trial and execution
After the end of the war, on 11 November 1945, a news agency reported that "a long sought-for beauty in male costume was arrested in Beijing by counter-intelligence officers." She was held at Hebei Model Prison.

The Supreme Court of Hebei originally addressed Kawashima as "Chuandao Fangzi" (the Chinese pronunciation of her Japanese name). When her trial began a month later, Kawashima identified herself by her Chinese name, "Jin Bihui", which eventually became the name court officials used. However, in accordance with her lawyers' strategy to deflect her charge of treason, she gradually began to emphasise a Japanese or Manchu banner identity. The court rejected the defence's bid to have her tried as a war criminal rather than as a domestic traitor, based on a combination of jus sanguinis and Kawashima's failure to formally renounce her citizenship through China's Department of Civil Affairs.

Charged with treason as a hanjian on 20 October 1947, she was executed by a bullet shot into the back of her head on 25 March 1948, and her body was later put on public display.

Her body was collected by a Japanese monk to be cremated. Her remains were sent back to her adoptive family and later buried at Shōrinji temple in Matsumoto, Nagano Prefecture, Japan.

Gallery

In popular culture
In the Chinese language, Kawashima's name (both Chuandao Fangzi and Jin Bihui) are synonymous with the idea of a "female spy" or a hanjian.

Films
 In Bernardo Bertolucci's 1987 film The Last Emperor, Kawashima appeared as "Eastern Jewel", played by Maggie Han.
 Miyuki Takakura portrayed Kawashima in the 1957 Japanese film, Sen'un Ajia no Joō.
 Anita Mui portrayed Kawashima in a 1990 Hong Kong film, Kawashima Yoshiko.
 Wong Wan-sze portrayed Kawashima in 1991 Hong Kong film, God of Gamblers III: Back to Shanghai
 Kawashima was portrayed by Rei Kikukawa in the 2007 Japanese drama Ri Kouran, which tells the story of the life of Yoshiko Yamaguchi.
 Meisa Kuroki portrayed Kawashima in the 2008 Japanese drama Dansō no Reijin: Kawashima Yoshiko no Shōgai.
 Kawashima was portrayed by Shu Qi in the Hong Kong film, Legend of the Fist: The Return of Chen Zhen

Books
The private papers of Eastern Jewel by Maureen Lindley. Based on the real-life story of Yoshiko Kawashima, Chinese princess turned ruthless Japanese spy, with fictional embellishments.

Two books titled The Beauty in Men's Clothing have been published about Yoshiko, the first a partly-fictionalized novel by Muramatsu Shōfū published in 1933, the second by Shōfū's grandson Tomomi in 2002 about the composition of the former.

Video games
Kawashima appears as a lieutenant colonel of the Japanese army in the 2004 JRPG game Shadow Hearts: Covenant.
Kawashima appears as an army general for Manchukuo, and doubles as a spy agent/operative in the expansion "La Résistance" for both Japan and Manchukuo in the 2016 World War II grand strategy game Hearts of Iron IV, by Paradox Interactive.

References

Crowdy, Terry, The Enemy Within (Oxford: Osprey, 2006), Chapter 10

Bibliography

External links
 男裝女諜川島芳子

1907 births
1948 deaths
Executed Chinese collaborators with Imperial Japan
Executed Chinese women
Executed spies
Female wartime spies
Manchu people
Aisin Gioro
Female wartime cross-dressers
People of Manchukuo
LGBT royalty
World War II spies for Japan
Executed Republic of China people
Executed people from Beijing
People executed by the Republic of China by firing squad
20th-century executions by China
Women in war in China
Women in World War II
Qing dynasty princesses